Rhodobates nodicornella is a moth of the family Tineidae first described by Rebel in 1911. It is found in Lebanon and Jordan.

References

Moths described in 1911
Myrmecozelinae
Insects of the Middle East
Fauna of Jordan
Fauna of Lebanon